Choteau Mountain is an  mountain summit located in Teton County, Montana.

Description

Choteau Mountain is located along the Rocky Mountain Front, which is a subset of the Rocky Mountains. It is situated 26 miles northwest of the town of Choteau, in the Lewis and Clark National Forest. Precipitation runoff from the mountain drains into tributaries of the Teton River.

Geology

Choteau Mountain is composed of sedimentary rock laid down during the Precambrian to Jurassic periods. Formed in shallow seas, this sedimentary rock was pushed east and over the top of younger rock during the Laramide orogeny.

Climate

Based on the Köppen climate classification, Choteau Mountain is located in a subarctic climate zone characterized by long, usually very cold winters, and mild to warm summers. Winter temperatures can drop below −10 °F with wind chill factors below −30 °F.

Gallery

See also

 Geology of the Rocky Mountains

References

External links
 Weather: Choteau Mountain

Mountains of Montana
North American 2000 m summits
Lewis and Clark National Forest